Ulfilas (–383), also spelled Ulphilas and Orphila, all Latinized forms of the unattested Gothic form *𐍅𐌿𐌻𐍆𐌹𐌻𐌰 Wulfila, literally "Little Wolf", was a Goth of Cappadocian Greek descent who served as a bishop and missionary, participated in the Arian controversy, and is credited with the translation of the Bible into Gothic. He developed the Gothic alphabet – inventing a writing system based on the Greek alphabet – in order for the Bible to be translated into the Gothic language. Although the translation of the Bible into the Gothic language has traditionally been ascribed to Ulfilas, analysis of the text of the Gothic Bible indicates the involvement of a team of translators, possibly under his supervision.

Biography

Ulfilas's parents were of non-Gothic descent. Ulfilas may have spoken some Greek in his own family circle, since they were of Greek origin; he is likely to have been able to draw on formal education in both Latin and Greek in creating Gothic as a literary language. Philostorgius, to whom we are indebted for much important information about Ulfilas, was a Cappadocian. He knew that the ancestors of Ulfilas had also come from Cappadocia, a region with which the Gothic community had always maintained close ties. Ulfilas's parents were captured by plundering Goths in the village of Sadagolthina in the city district of Parnassus (near modern-day Şereflikoçhisar) and were carried off to Transdanubia (the Gothic-held lands north of the Danube in and around modern Muntenia). This supposedly took place in 264. Raised as a Goth, he later became proficient in both Greek and Latin.  Ulfilas converted many among the Goths and preached Arianism, which, when they reached the western Mediterranean, set them apart from their orthodox neighbours and subjects.

Ulfilas was ordained a bishop by Eusebius of Nicomedia (who baptized the Emperor Constantine) and returned to his people to work as a missionary. In 348, after seven years as missionary, Ulfila was expelled from the Gothic region in order to escape religious persecution by a Gothic chief, probably Athanaric. This incident can certainly have a political nuance, probably the Goth saw Ulfilas's activity as a form of Roman infiltration. Ulfilas obtained permission from Constantius II to migrate with his flock of converts from Northern Danube to Moesia and settle near Nicopolis ad Istrum in modern northern Bulgaria. There, Ulfilas devised the Gothic alphabet and presided over the translation of the Bible from Greek into the Gothic language, which was performed by a group of translators. Fragments of the Gothic Bible translation have survived, notably the Codex Argenteus held since 1648 in the University Library of Uppsala in Sweden. A parchment page of this Bible was found in 1971 in the Speyer Cathedral.

Historical sources

There are five primary sources for the study of Ulfilas's life.  Two are by Arian authors, three by imperial Church (Nicene Christianity) authors.

 Arian sources
 Life of Ulphilas in the Letter of Auxentius
 Remaining fragments of Historia Ecclesiastica by Philostorgius
 Nicene Christianity sources
 Historia Ecclesiastica by Sozomen
 Historia Ecclesiastica by Socrates Scholasticus
 Historia Ecclesiastica by Theodoret

There are significant differences between the stories presented by the two camps. The Arian sources depict Ulfilas as an Arian from childhood. He was then consecrated as a bishop around 340 and evangelized among the Goths for seven years during the 340s. He then moved to Moesia (within the Roman Empire) under the protection of the Arian Emperor Constantius II. He later attended several councils and engaged in continuing religious debate. His death is dated from 383.

The accounts by the Imperial Church historians differ in several details, but the general picture is similar. According to them, Ulfilas was an orthodox Christian for most of his early life and converted to Arianism only around 360 because of political pressure from the pro-Arian ecclesiastical and governmental powers. The sources differ in how much they credit Ulfilas with the conversion of the Goths. Socrates Scholasticus gives Ulfilas a minor role and instead attributes the mass conversion to the Gothic chieftain Fritigern, who adopted Arianism out of gratitude for the military support of the Arian emperor. Sozomen attributes the mass conversion primarily to Ulfilas but also acknowledges the role of Fritigern.

For several reasons, modern scholars depend more heavily on the Arian accounts than the Imperial Church accounts. Auxentius was clearly the closest to Ulfilas and so presumably had access to more reliable information. The Nicene accounts differ too widely among themselves to present a unified case. Debate continues as to the best reconstruction of Ulfilas's life.

Creed of Ulfilas
The Creed of Ulfilas concludes a letter praising him written by his foster son and pupil Auxentius of Durostorum. It distinguishes God the Father ("unbegotten") from God the Son ("only-begotten"), who was begotten before time and created the world, and the Holy Spirit, proceeding from the Father and the Son:

I, Ulfila, bishop and confessor, have always so believed, and in this, the one true faith, I make the journey to my Lord; I believe in one God the Father, the only unbegotten and invisible, and in his only-begotten son, our Lord and God, the designer and maker of all creation, having none other like him (so that one alone among all beings is God the Father, who is also the God of our God); and in one Holy Spirit, the illuminating and sanctifying power, as Christ said after his resurrection to his apostles: "And behold, I send the promise of my Father upon you; but tarry ye in the city of Jerusalem, until ye be clothed with power from on high" (Luke 24:49) and again "But ye shall receive power, when the Holy Ghost is come upon you" (Acts 1:8); being neither God (the Father) nor our God (Christ), but the minister of Christ... subject and obedient in all things to the Son; and the Son, subject and obedient in all things to God who is his Father... (whom) he ordained in the Holy Spirit through his Christ.

Maximinus, a 5th-century Arian theologian, copied Auxentius's letter, among other works, into the margins of one copy of Ambrose's De Fide; there are some gaps in the surviving text.

Honours
Wulfila Glacier on Greenwich Island in the South Shetland Islands, Antarctica is named after Bishop Ulfilas.

See also

Mardonius
Gothic Bible
Gothic Christianity
Germanic Christianity

Notes and references

Bibliography 
 H. C. von Gabelentz, J. Loebe, Ulfilas: Veteris et Novi Testamenti Versionis Gothicae fragmenta quae supersunt, Leipzig, Libraria Schnuphasiana, 1843.
 Carla Falluomini, The Gothic Version of the Gospels and Pauline Epistles. Cultural Background, Transmission and Character, Berlino, Walter de Gruyter, 2015 (Capitolo 1: "Wulfila and his context", pp. 4–24.)
Peter J. Heather, John Matthews, The Goths in the Fourth Century, Liverpool University Press, 1991 (with the translations of selected texts: Chapter 5. The Life and Work of Ulfila, 124; 6. The Gothic Bible 145; 7. Selections from the Gothic Bible 163–185).

External links

Jim Marchand's translation on Auxentius' letter on Ulfilas' career and beliefs, with Latin text
Project Wulfila
Gothic fonts after Ulfilas
Ulfilas, the Apostle of the Goths by Charles A. Anderson Scott in BTM format

Arian bishops
4th-century Gothic bishops
4th-century Christian theologians
Bible translators
Creators of writing systems
310 births
383 deaths
Gothic Bible
4th-century translators